Jamain Stephens (born January 9, 1974) is a former American football offensive tackle who played in the National Football League (NFL) for the Pittsburgh Steelers and Cincinnati Bengals.

Pittsburgh Steelers
After a stellar college career for North Carolina A&T, the Pittsburgh Steelers selected him in the first round (29th overall) in the 1996 NFL Draft. Blessed with great size (6'6), the Steelers selected him as a "project" player and projected him to be a great starting tackle with several years of development.

Despite the lofty expectations placed on him by the Steelers, Stephens' career with the Steelers was marred by mediocrity and a poor work ethic on Stephens' part. Despite his lack of development, he managed to start ten games (he played in 11) for the Steelers in the 1998 season, beating out Paul Wiggins for the starting right tackle job in training camp.

Cincinnati Bengals
Stephens was promptly signed by the rival Cincinnati Bengals after the Steelers. Stephens played with the Bengals from 1999–2002.

Personal life 

Jamain Stephens married Natisha (Melchor) Stephens on July 29, 2020, in Greensboro, North Carolina. They currently reside in Inner Harbor, Baltimore Maryland. 

On September 8, 2020, Jamain's son, Jamain Stephens Jr. died from complications associated with COVID-19 at age 20. 
His son played college football at California University of Pennsylvania.

References

1974 births
Living people
American football offensive tackles
Cincinnati Bengals players
North Carolina A&T Aggies football players
Pittsburgh Steelers players
People from Lumberton, North Carolina
Players of American football from North Carolina